Oberkassel Mitte is a Bonn Stadtbahn station served by lines 62 and 66. It is located in the suburb Oberkassel.

References

External links

Cologne-Bonn Stadtbahn stations
Bonn Straßenbahn stations